Quilapayún is the self-titled debut album released by the Chilean musical group Quilapayún in 1966.

Track listing
"La paloma"/The dove (Eduardo Carrasco)
"El forastero"/The foreigner (Carlos Préndez Saldías - Eduardo Carrasco)
"El canto de la cúculi"/The song of the turtle dove (Eduardo Carrasco)
"El pueblo"/The People (Ángel Parra)
"La boliviana"/The Bolivian girl (Popular)
"La cueca triste"/The Sad Cueca dance (Víctor Jara - Eduardo Carrasco)
"Canción del minero" [o El minero]/Song of the miner (Víctor Jara)
"Dos palomitas"/Two doves (Popular)
"Por una pequeña chispa"/For a little spark (Popular)
"La perdida"/The loss (Juan Ramón Jiménez - Quilapayún)
"El borrachito"/The drunkard (Popular)
"Somos pájaros libres"/We are free birds (Víctor Jara)

Personnel
Eduardo Carrasco
Julio Carrasco
Julio Numhauser
Carlos Quezada
Víctor Jara

Quilapayún albums
1966 debut albums